Theater der Welt (Theatre of the World) is an international theatre festival in Germany initiated by the International Theatre Institute. The main objective is to present theatre productions from all over the world. It became triennial in 1993 and takes place each time in a different city with a different artistic director.

Editions
1981 Cologne
1985 Frankfurt am Main
1987 Stuttgart
1989 Hamburg
1991 Essen
1993 Munich
1996 Dresden
1999 Berlin
2002 Cologne, Bonn, Düsseldorf, Duisburg
2005 Stuttgart
2008 Halle (Saale)
2010 Essen and Mülheim an der Ruhr
2014 Mannheim
2017 Hamburg

Notes

External links
 Theater der Welt website

Theatre festivals in Germany
Cultural festivals in Germany